Koen Decoster is a Belgian historian, philosopher and translator. He has published works such as Flavius Josephus and the Seleucid Acra in Jerusalem (1989). and Beyond Conflict and Reduction: Between Philosophy, Science and Religion (2001) with William Desmond and John Steffen.

References

20th-century Belgian historians
20th-century Belgian philosophers
21st-century Belgian philosophers
Belgian translators
Living people
Year of birth missing (living people)